Fabio Milano (born 2 August 1977) is an Italian baseball player who competed in the 2004 Summer Olympics.

References

1977 births
Baseball players at the 2004 Summer Olympics
Living people
Olympic baseball players of Italy
Fortitudo Baseball Bologna players